Cascade National Forest was established by the U.S. Forest Service in Oregon on March 2, 1907 with  when its name was shortened from Cascade Range National Forest and land was added. On July 1, 1933 the entire forest was combined with Santiam National Forest to establish Willamette National Forest.

References

External links
Forest History Society
Forest History Society:Listing of the National Forests of the United States Text from Davis, Richard C., ed. Encyclopedia of American Forest and Conservation History. New York: Macmillan Publishing Company for the Forest History Society, 1983. Vol. II, pp. 743–788.

Former National Forests of Oregon
1907 establishments in Oregon
Protected areas established in 1907
1933 disestablishments in Oregon